"Bein' Green" (also known as "It's Not Easy Bein' Green") is a song written by Joe Raposo, originally performed by Jim Henson as Kermit the Frog on both Sesame Street and The Muppet Show (in the episodes "Peter Ustinov" and "Peter Sellers"). It later was covered by Ray Charles, Frank Sinatra, and other performers. Bein' Green is considered the signature song of Kermit the Frog.

Background
In the Muppets version, Kermit begins by lamenting his green coloration, expressing that green "blends in with so many ordinary things" and wishing to be some other color. But by the end of the song, Kermit recalls positive associations with the color green, and concludes by accepting and embracing his greenness.

Cover recordings
 Jim Henson as Kermit the Frog, various Muppet productions, starting with The Sesame Street Book & Record in 1970, until 1990 following Henson's death
 Steve Whitmire as Kermit the Frog, various Muppet productions (1990–2016)
 Thurl Ravenscroft, 1970 album Rubber Duckie and Other Songs From Sesame Street
 Frank Sinatra, 1971 album Sinatra & Company, this recording would later be used on Sesame Street in an animated insert by Étienne Delessert.
 Lena Horne, 1971 album Nature's Baby
 Urbie Green, 1972 album Bein' Green
 Buddy Rich, 1972 album Stick It
 Van Morrison, 1973 album Hard Nose the Highway
 Stan Kenton, 1973 7.5 on the Richter Scale, titled "It's Not Easy Bein' Green"
 Della Reese, 1973 album Let Me in Your Life
 John Leyton, 1973 eponymous album
 Diana Ross, 1974 album Live at Caesars Palace
 Ray Charles, 1975 album Renaissance; this version gained popularity because of an episode of The Cosby Show, and Charles then sang a duet with Kermit on Sesame Street and The Cher Show as well as sang the song on the 1989 special Sesame Street... 20 Years & Still Counting
 Jackie McLean, 1978 album New Wine in Old Bottles
 Keith Harris and Orville the Duck, 1983 single
 William Roy, 1986 single "When I Sing Alone"
 Wilford Brimley, 1989 MDA Labor Day Telethon
 Mandy Patinkin, 1990 album Dress Casual
 Rowlf the Dog, 1993 album Ol' Brown Ears is Back
 Jill O'Hara, 1993 album Jill O'Hara, titled "Green"
 Shirley Horn, 1993 album Light Out of Darkness (A Tribute to Ray Charles)
 Don Henley with Kermit, 1994 album Kermit Unpigged
 Mike Campbell, 1994 Easy Chair Jazz
 Vanessa Rubin, 1995 album Vanessa Rubin Sings
 Boston Pops Orchestra, 1996 album Wish Upon a Star/All-Time Children's Favorites
 Johnny Lytle, 1997 album Easy Easy, completely instrumental
 Tony Bennett, 1998 album The Playground
 Bob McGrath, 1998 album Bob's Favorite Street Songs
 Manfred Krug, 2000 album Schlafstörung, titled "Frosches Lied (Bein' Green)" with German lyrics
 Andy Hallett, as Lorne in TV series Angel episode "The House Always Wins", and on the 2004 soundtrack album, Angel: Live Fast, Die Never
 Mark Murphy, 2005 album Once to Every Heart
 Caroll Spinney as Oscar the Grouch, 2005 season of Sesame Street
 Till Brönner, German jazz bugler, 2004 album That Summer (vocal version) and 1994 album Generations of Jazz (instrumental version)
 Audra McDonald, 2006 album Build a Bridge
 Sophie Milman, 2007 album Make Someone Happy
 Matthew White, Music and Sweet Poetry Agree
 Take 6, 2008 album The Standard
 Andrew Bird, 2011 tribute/cover album Muppets: The Green Album
 Damian McGinty, 2011 episode "Pot O' Gold" Glee
 Cee Lo Green and Kermit, 2012 episode The Voice
 Brenna Whitaker, 2015 album We Love Disney
 Imelda May and the RTÉ Concert Orchestra at a televised live event to mark the centenary of the 1916 Easter Rising
 Matt Vogel as Kermit the Frog and Elvis Costello, 2019 TV special Sesame Street's 50th Anniversary Celebration

Memorial
The song was sung by Big Bird (Caroll Spinney) at the two memorial services for Jim Henson in 1990.

In politics
UK Prime Minister Boris Johnson used the song as an example for his environmental policy, saying that Kermit was wrong and it is easy to be green.

See also
 "Rainbow Connection"

References

External links
 

1970 songs
1970 singles
1970s ballads
Kermit the Frog
The Muppets songs
Ray Charles songs
Sesame Street songs
Songs about amphibians
Songs from television series
Songs written by Joe Raposo
Tony Bennett songs
Van Morrison songs
Frank Sinatra songs
Songs about race and ethnicity